Koala's March is a bite-sized cookie snack with a sweet filling. Made by Lotte, the product was first released in Japan in March 1984. In May 1990, the products were released in the United States. Originally, the snacks used the name "Koala Yummies" in the United States. But currently, the snacks use the name "Koala's March" in the same country (a translation of the Japanese title).

Koala's March is in the shape of a koala with a picture of a koala on the outside of the cookie doing various activities. The filling comes in various flavors, such as honey, vanilla, cafe latte and banana including frozen banana. The two most common flavors are strawberry and chocolate, and are two of the flavors available in the U.S., along with white chocolate and matcha creme-filled chocolate cookies. The snack also comes in pineapple flavor, though it is rarer than the other flavors. Koala's March supports the Australian conservation group Australian Koala Foundation.

They also have cards, naming the different types of "koalas".

See also
 Hello Panda
 Teddy Grahams
 Tiny Teddy

External links 

 Koala's March USA website (archived)
 Koara no Māchi section on Lotte's website  

Products introduced in 1984
2008 Chinese milk scandal
Brand name cookies
Fictional koalas
Food recalls
Japanese brand foods
Japanese snack food
Lotte (conglomerate) products